Princeville is an Amerindian community in the Potaro-Siparuni Region of Guyana.

It is located some 12 miles away from Mahdia along the Potaro River. The location used to be called Kangaruma Junction, but was renamed after Alan Prince, its founder. Princeville was established in the late 1980s by a group of Amerindians who felt that it was necessary to create an area to develop their culture and to have access to rich farmlands. The village is a satellite of and managed by the Village Captain and Councilors of Campbelltown.

Economic activity 
Most of the residents are Patamona or Wapishana people. Mining and farming are the main economic activities. Subsistence farming is practiced by the residents. Crops grown are cassava, bananas, plantains, pineapples, cashews and cashew nuts. Men and women are engaged in fishing, farming and hunting activities. The traditional communal lifestyle is maintained in this village where labour and food is shared among the residents. Some men are employed as guides, labourers and miners, but older men remain as father figures in the village.

Public services 
Princeville has a health hut, served by a community health worker. It has a primary school and secondary schooling is done in Mahdia. A building to house teachers is under construction. The village has a few small shops. The village lacks electricity, residents use privately owned generators. Access to this area is difficult and the area is only accessible to four-wheel-drive vehicles by trail from the Bartica/Potaro Road.

References

Populated places in Potaro-Siparuni